Bruton is a small town and civil parish in Somerset, England

Bruton may also refer to:

People
Bruton (surname)
Bruton Smith

Places
Bruton, Central Ontario, Canada, in Dysart et al, Ontario
Bruton Abbey, Somerset, England
Bruton High School, Virginia, United States
Bruton Parish Church, Virginia, United States
Bruton School for Girls, Somerset, England

Other uses
Bruton, an iguanodon in the 2000 Disney animated film Dinosaur
Bruton, also known as Pluto, a fictional robot

See also 
Brewton (disambiguation)
Burton (disambiguation)